Buyerak-Popovsky is a rural locality (a khutor) and the administrative center of Buyerak-Popovskoye Rural Settlement, Serafimovichsky District, Volgograd Oblast, Russia. The population was 499 as of 2010. There are 7 streets.

Geography 
Buyerak-Popovsky is located near the Don River, 14 km southwest of Serafimovich (the district's administrative centre) by road. Buyerak-Senyutkin is the nearest rural locality.

References 

Rural localities in Serafimovichsky District